Charlotte Township is one of twenty-four townships in Bates County, Missouri, and is part of the Kansas City metropolitan area within the USA.  As of the 2000 census, its population was 367.

Geography
According to the United States Census Bureau, Charlotte Township covers an area of 35.97 square miles (93.15 square kilometers); of this, 35.87 square miles (92.91 square kilometers, 99.74 percent) is land and 0.09 square miles (0.24 square kilometers, 0.26 percent) is water.

Unincorporated towns
 Virginia at 
(This list is based on USGS data and may include former settlements.)

Adjacent townships
 Elkhart Township (north)
 Mound Township (northeast)
 Mount Pleasant Township (east)
 New Home Township (south)
 Walnut Township (southwest)
 Homer Township (west)
 West Point Township (northwest)

Cemeteries
The township contains these two cemeteries: Park and Virginia.

Major highways
  Missouri Route 52

Lakes
 Butler Lake

Landmarks
 Park Cemetery
 Virginia Cemetery

School districts
 Butler R-V School District
 Miami R-I

Political districts
 Missouri's 4th congressional district
 State House District 125
 State Senate District 31

References
 United States Census Bureau 2008 TIGER/Line Shapefiles
 United States Board on Geographic Names (GNIS)
 United States National Atlas

External links
 US-Counties.com
 City-Data.com

Townships in Bates County, Missouri
Townships in Missouri